The following people are Welsh recipients of the Victoria Cross during World War I, with a default sort by surname.

{| class="wikitable sortable"
! colspan=1 width="35%" | Name 
! colspan=1 width="10%" | Year 
! colspan=1 width="15%" | Conflict 
! colspan=1 width="25%" class="unsortable" | Place 
! colspan=1 width="20%" | Country 
|-
| Frederick Barter
| 1915
| World War I
| Festubert
| France
|-
| Robert James Bye
| 1917
| World War I
| Yser Canal
| Belgium
|-
| James Llewellyn Davies
| 1917
| World War I
| Polygon Wood
| Belgium
|-
| Lewis Pugh Evans
| 1917
| World War I
| Zonnebeke
| Belgium
|-
| John Fox-Russell
| 1917
| World War I
| Tel-el-Khuweilfeh
| Palestine
|-
| William Charles Fuller
| 1914
| World War I
| Chivy-sur-Aisne
| France
|-
| Hubert William Lewis
| 1916
| World War I
| Macukovo
| Greece
|-
| Ivor Rees
| 1917
| World War I
| Pilkem
| Belgium
|-
| Lionel Wilmot Brabazon Rees
| 1916
| World War I
| Double Crassieurs
| France
|-
| Richard William Leslie Wain
| 1917
| World War I
| Cambrai/Marcoing
| France
|-
| William Herbert Waring
| 1918
| World War I
| Ronssoy
| France
|-
| Henry Weale
| 1918
| World War I
| Bazentin-le-Grand
| France
|-
| John (Jack) Henry Williams
| 1918
| World War I
| Villers Outreaux
| France
|-
| William Williams
| 1917
| World War I
| Atlantic
| France
|-
|}

 W
 W